Variimorda persica is a species of tumbling flower beetles in the subfamily Mordellinae of the family Mordellidae.

References

External links
 Biolib
 Fauna Europaea

Mordellidae
Beetles of Europe
Beetles described in 1985